TED Ankara Kolejliler Women’s Volleyball is the women's volleyball section of the Turkish sports club TED Ankara Kolejliler S.K. in Ankara, Turkey. Founded in 1954 in Ankara, the club's colors are blue, red and white. The team plays its home matches at the Başkent Volleyball Hall.

The team is coached by Yusuf Çavuşoğlu.

2012-2013 roster
Coach:  Yusuf Çavuşoğlu

References

External links
 Official TED Ankara Kolejliler S.K Website 
 Turkish Volleyball Federastion Official Website 

Women's volleyball teams in Turkey
Volleyball clubs in Ankara
Volleyball clubs established in 1954
1954 establishments in Turkey